The 1945–46 Michigan Wolverines men's basketball team represented the University of Michigan in intercollegiate basketball during the 1945–46 season.  The team finished the season in seventh place in the Big Ten Conference with an overall record of 12–7 and 6–6 against conference opponents.

Bennie Oosterbaan was in his eighth and final year as the team's head coach.  Glen Selbo was the team's leading scorer with 212 points in 19 games for an average of 11.2 points per game.  Dave Strack was the team captain.

Statistical leaders

References

Michigan
Michigan Wolverines men's basketball seasons
Michigan Wolverines basketball
Michigan Wolverines basketball